Captain George Amelius Crawshay Sandeman (18 April 1882 – 26 April 1915) was an English first-class cricketer. Sandeman was a left-handed batsman who bowled slow left-arm orthodox.

Early life 
George Amelius Crawshay Sandeman was born on 18 April 1882, in London.  His father was Lt. Col. George Glas Sandeman, of that family of wine merchants, and his mother (who died on 24 April 1882) was Amy Sandeman.

He was educated at Eton College, from where he left in 1902 to study at Christ Church, Oxford.

Published works 
Sandeman authored two history books.  Calais under English Rule (1908) was adapted from an essay which had won the Arnold Prize earlier the same year.  He subsequently wrote Metternich (1911), a biography of the famous Austrian statesman.

Cricketing career 
Sandeman made his first-class debut for Hampshire against Nottinghamshire in the 1913 County Championship, representing them in three first-class matches altogether, all in the 1913 season. His final appearance for the county came against Kent. Sandeman took 3 wickets for Hampshire at a bowling average of 41.33.

In 1914 he made his debut for the Marylebone Cricket Club, representing them in a single first-class match against Oxford University.

Sandeman also represented the Free Foresters in the same season, against both Oxford University and Cambridge University.

Military service 
Sandeman served in the First World War as a captain in the Hampshire Regiment. He went to France on 27 August 1914 but was killed in action only a few months later, at Zonnebeke, Belgium, on 26 April 1915.

References

Sources 
https://www.chch.ox.ac.uk/fallen-alumni/captain-george-amelius-crawshay-sandeman

External links
George Sandeman at Cricinfo
George Sandeman at CricketArchive

1880s births
1915 deaths
People from Westminster
English cricketers
Hampshire cricketers
Marylebone Cricket Club cricketers
Free Foresters cricketers
British Army personnel of World War I
Royal Hampshire Regiment officers
British military personnel killed in World War I